was a Japanese daimyō of the late Edo period, who ruled the Hasunoike Domain in Hizen Province (modern-day Saga Prefecture).

References
 Naotomo on Nekhet's "World Nobility" site (14 September 2007)

1798 births
1864 deaths
Tozama daimyo
Nabeshima clan